Mrázovce is a village and municipality in Stropkov District in the Prešov Region of north-eastern Slovakia.

History
In historical records, the village was first mentioned in 1408.

Geography
The municipality lies at an altitude of 248 metres and covers an area of 4.653 km². It has a population of about 100 people.

References

External links
 

Villages and municipalities in Stropkov District
Zemplín (region)